Streptomyces paludis is a Gram-positive bacterium species from the genus of Streptomyces which has been isolated from alpine wetland soil.

See also 
 List of Streptomyces species

References 

paludis
Bacteria described in 2020